Bawan Tuo Mosque, also known as Babussalam Mosque, is one of the oldest mosques in Indonesia located in Nagari Bawan, Ampek Nagari Subdistrict, Agam Regency, West Sumatra. The mosque, which was first established in 1800, is a relic of Rajo Kaciak in the territory of Lambah Bawan Kingdom, the last area in Minangkabau which was controlled by the Dutch East India Company. The mosque is 40 x 40 square meters, and stands on one hectare of waqf (endowed) land.

History 
The construction of this mosque was initiated by Rajo Kacik in 1800. At first the location of the mosque was a muddy ground area, but then because of the increasing danger of collapse, in 1942 it was rebuilt not far from the original location, which is the location where the mosque stands today.

See also 

 Islam in Indonesia
 List of mosques in Indonesia

References 
 Footnotes

 Bibliography

 
 

Mosques in Indonesia
Islam in West Sumatra